Pete Droge (born March 11, 1969) is an American alternative/folk rock musician from Vashon Island in Washington State's Puget Sound.

Droge was born in Seattle, Washington, and grew up in Bainbridge Island.

1990s
In 1994, Droge released Necktie Second, his debut album which featured the tongue-in-cheek "If You Don't Love Me (I'll Kill Myself)" (which also appeared on the soundtrack to the film Dumb and Dumber), as well as "Sunspot Stopwatch" and "So I am Over You".

In 1996, Droge released Find a Door, an album under the name of Pete Droge and The Sinners; his backing band included Dave Hull (bass), Rob Brill (drums), Peter Stroud (guitar/vocals) and Elaine Summers (guitar/vocals). This album met with critical success but received little airplay. Notable songs include "You Should Be Running", "Dear Diane" and "Mr. Jade". That same year, Droge contributed the title song to the film, Beautiful Girls.

In 1998, Droge released Spacey and Shakin', another solo album.

Other credits included contributions to albums by Kim Richey and Stone Gossard.

2000s 

In 2000, Droge appeared in the film Almost Famous as a "Hyatt Singer", performing "Small Time Blues" with Elaine Summers. According to director Cameron Crowe on the Director's Cut Commentary of the movie, the small part was a tribute to Gram Parsons and Emmylou Harris, whom he met in 1973.

In 2003, Droge formed the supergroup The Thorns with artists Matthew Sweet and Shawn Mullins and, that same year, released another solo album, Skywatching. In 2006, Droge released Under the Waves and a song from that album, "Going Whichever Way the Wind Blows", was featured in a Toyota Sequoia commercial.

In 2009, Droge's song "Two of the Lucky Ones" was featured in the film Zombieland.

Discography
 West of Here (with the Ramadillo) 
 Necktie Second (1994, American Recordings)
 Find a Door (1996, American Recordings)
 Spacey And Shakin'  (1998, Epic)
 The Thorns (with Matthew Sweet and Shawn Mullins) (2003)
 Skywatching (2003, Puzzle Tree)
 Under The Waves (2006, Puzzle Tree)
 Volume One (with Elaine Summers) (2009, Puzzle Tree)
 Volume Two (with Elaine Summers) (2014, Puzzle Tree)

References

External links

American folk musicians
Living people
1969 births
People from Vashon, Washington
People from Bainbridge Island, Washington
The Thorns members